Richard Waitt (died 1732) was a Scottish painter.

Waitt was taught by John Scougal, and started out as a decorative painter focusing mainly on still lifes. However, later he painted primarily portraits, and for many years worked almost exclusively with the Clan Grant. He was active from c.1708 and died in 1732.

References

1732 deaths
18th-century Scottish painters
Scottish male painters
Year of birth unknown